Hardthöhe is a district at the western edge of Bonn, Germany. The headquarters of the Federal Ministry of Defense is located in Hardthöhe since 1960. Hardthöhe was not part of Bonn before 1969. Instead, it belonged to the Amt Duisdorf. In 1969, Hardthöhe, together with Duisdorf and Lengsdorf, were assigned to the municipal district of Hardtberg, Bonn.

History
When in 1960, the Federal Ministry of Defense began planning its transfer from Ermekeilkaserne Base to Hardthöhe, there was already a former location and a barrack built in the form of a settlement. This "1000-man" barracks, which had been created from 1956 onwards, also called "Wagenburg", were four rows of office buildings covered with saddle roofs. Until the middle of the 1960s, the Federal Building Office had five six-storey and interconnected office buildings ("200s"), a ten-storey high-rise building, a three-story so-called "ministerial building", a casino building and a two-storey building. From 1966 to 1968 the construction of the then technical headquarters of the mechanical engineering system was followed in the south, and in the west from 1967 to 1968 a medical area (architect, among others Ernst van Dorp). The central entrance and guard building (Nordwache) was established in the north of the site in 1969. In 1971, the military unit for the staff and supply battalion was expanded.

The Hardthöhe site was extensively expanded following a building competition from 1973 to 1987, when an office space of 50,000 square meters was added to the existing buildings with the inner service (until 1983) and the so-called central area (until 1987). 
Responsible for these buildings was the competition group Groth and Lehmann-Walter. In a further construction phase, following a new architectural competition in 1986 to 1997, the new ministerial building and a pyramid-shaped southern casino, planned by Bad Nauheimer architect Johannes Peter Hölzinger, followed. In the 1990s, the reconstruction of the partially listed buildings from the 1950s and 1960s began. In March 1997, the construction of a new direct road connection to the previously only provisional south station was begun and opened in April 1998. In 2000, the shooting range in Hardthöhe was closed. From 2000 to 2002, the new medical center, which was no longer modern, was expanded by a new building, and existing buildings were rebuilt by 2006. The so-called Nordwache was renewed in 2006-08 and 2010-11. At the beginning of 2013 the Federal Office for Infrastructure, Environmental Protection and Services moved from the Ermekeilil barracks to the Hardthöh.

References

Urban districts and boroughs of Bonn